De Jantjes can refer to:

 De Jantjes (1922 film), a 1922 Dutch film
 De Jantjes (1934 film), a 1934 Dutch film
 De Jantjes (musical), a Dutch musical